Joseph Talbot may refer to:

 Joseph E. Talbot (1901–1966), U.S. Representative from Connecticut
 Joseph C. Talbot (1816–1883), bishop of the Episcopal Diocese of Indiana
 Joseph Talbot (priest), Dean of Cashel, 1924–46
 Joe Talbot (musician), musician